Morgan Township is a township in Greene County, Pennsylvania, United States. The population was 2,348 at the 2020 census.

Geography
Morgan Township is in northeastern Greene County and is bordered to the north by Washington County. Tenmile Creek, an eastward-flowing tributary of the Monongahela River, forms the short northeastern border of the township, while the South Fork of Tenmile Creek forms the longer southeastern border. The borough of Clarksville, located between the two creeks at their confluence, borders the northeastern corner of the township.

Unincorporated communities in the township include Teagarden Homes, Burson Plan, Chartiers, Mather, Stony Point, and Lippincott.

Demographics

As of the census of 2000, there were 2,600 people, 1,025 households, and 744 families residing in the township.  The population density was 106.0 people per square mile (40.9/km2).  There were 1,117 housing units at an average density of 45.5/sq mi (17.6/km2).  The racial makeup of the township was 98.69% White, 0.46% African American, 0.23% Native American, 0.08% Asian, 0.04% from other races, and 0.50% from two or more races. Hispanic or Latino of any race were 0.38% of the population.

There were 1,025 households, out of which 27.9% had children under the age of 18 living with them, 58.0% were married couples living together, 10.3% had a female householder with no husband present, and 27.4% were non-families. 24.7% of all households were made up of individuals, and 12.5% had someone living alone who was 65 years of age or older.  The average household size was 2.53 and the average family size was 2.98.

In the township the population was spread out, with 22.7% under the age of 18, 8.0% from 18 to 24, 27.8% from 25 to 44, 25.7% from 45 to 64, and 15.7% who were 65 years of age or older.  The median age was 40 years. For every 100 females there were 100.2 males.  For every 100 females age 18 and over, there were 93.4 males.

The median income for a household in the township was $33,629, and the median income for a family was $38,009. Males had a median income of $34,659 versus $22,301 for females. The per capita income for the township was $15,588.  About 10.6% of families and 13.3% of the population were below the poverty line, including 19.7% of those under age 18 and 7.0% of those age 65 or over.

Government and infrastructure
A state prison site was located in Morgan Township; originally it was a juvenile prison operated by the Pennsylvania Department of Public Welfare. This became the Pennsylvania Department of Corrections State Correctional Institution – Waynesburg, an adult prison, in 1984. It closed in 2003, and the land was sold to Basalt Trap Rock Co.

Education
The school district is the Jefferson-Morgan School District.

References

Townships in Greene County, Pennsylvania